Penicillium concentricum is a coprophilic, anamorph fungus species of the genus of Penicillium which produces roquefortine C and patulin.

See also
List of Penicillium species

References

concentricum
Fungi described in 1976